Estonian Swedish are the eastern varieties of Swedish that were spoken in the formerly Swedish-populated areas of Estonia (locally known as Aiboland) on the islands of Ormsö (Vormsi), Ösel (Saaremaa), Dagö (Hiiumaa) and Runö (Ruhnu), and the peninsula (former island) of Nuckö (Noarootsi), by the local Estonian Swedes.

Until the evacuation of the Estonian Swedes near the end of World War II, both Swedish and Estonian were commonly spoken on the named islands. It is not clear if there are any mother-tongue speakers left. After Estonia's independence following the dissolution of the Soviet Union, Estonian Swedish experienced a revival, with courses in the language being offered on Dagö and Ösel.

Currently, the number of native speakers is unknown, but assumed to be low.

Samples 
Estonian Swedish comprises a number of sub-dialects, for example Nuckömål and Rågömål.

An example of the Nuckömål dialect from the Nordisk familjebok, compared with standard modern Swedish:

Standard Swedish:

English translation:
Stick the paring knife in the pole and turn the pole on the sledge, put the Helmet and Helmets for the sledge and drive to Nuckö.

The Gammalsvenska dialect of Swedish spoken in Ukraine is an archaic dialect of Estonian Swedish, having been brought to the village of Gammalsvenskby in the late 1700s by settlers from Dagö.

Writing system
Noarootsi Swedish is written with the same letters as Standard Swedish with a few phonetic additions:

Long vowels are indicated with a subscribed macron: .
Long consonants are doubled : .
The /d/ and / n/ rhotics are denoted with a dot below .
The Voiced retroflex flap /ɽ/, called "thick L", is noted with a dot below .
The voiceless postalveolar fricative consonant /ʃ/ is noted with a dot below .

See also 
 Swedish language
 Standard Swedish
 Finland Swedish
 Swedish dialects
 Gammalsvenska

References

Further reading 
 

Swedish dialects
Languages of Estonia